Bulgarian grammar is the grammar of the  Bulgarian language. Bulgarian is a South Slavic language that evolved from Old Church Slavonic—the written norm for the Slavic languages in the Middle Ages which derived from Proto-Slavic.
Bulgarian is also a part of the Balkan sprachbund, which also includes Greek, Macedonian, Romanian, Albanian and the Torlakian dialect of Serbian. It shares with them several grammatical innovations that set it apart from most other Slavic languages, even other South Slavic languages. Among these are a sharp reduction in noun inflections—Bulgarian has lost the noun cases but has developed a definite article, which is suffixed at the end of words. In its verbal system, Bulgarian is set apart from most Slavic languages by the loss of the infinitive, the preservation of most of the complexities of the older conjugation system (including the opposition between aorist and imperfect) and the development of a complex evidential system to distinguish between witnessed and several kinds of non-witnessed information.

Nouns

Bulgarian nouns have the categories grammatical gender, number (including count form), definiteness and vocative form.

Gender 
A noun has one of three specific grammatical genders (masculine, feminine, neuter).

Number 
A noun has two numbers (singular and plural), plus a numerical plural form. The plural is formed by adding to or replacing the singular ending, most commonly in the following ways:

With cardinal numbers and some adverbs, masculine nouns use a separate numerical plural form бройна множествена форма (broyna mnozhestvena forma). It is a vestige of the grammatical dual number, which disappeared from the language in the Middle Ages. The numerical form is used in the masculine whenever there is a precise amount of something, regardless of the actual number, e.g. –

 стол (stol "chair") → много столове (mnogo stolove "many chairs", general plural) → два стола / десет стола (dva stola / deset stola "two chairs / ten chairs", numerical plural).

Definiteness 
Definiteness is expressed by a definite article which is postfixed to the noun:

The definite article comes after plural ending:

Vocative form 
Vocative form is used for a noun that identifies a person (animal, object, etc.) being addressed.

 for family members – e.g. майка → майко (majka → majko "mother")
 for masculine names – e.g. Петър → Петре (Petar → Petre)
 in social descriptors – e.g. приятел → приятелю (prijatel → prijatelju "friend"), учител → учителю (učitel → učitelju "teacher")

From the first decades of the 20th century, there is a tendency to avoid vocative forms. This is true for many personal names, as the use of feminine name forms in -[ь/й]o and of the potential vocative forms of foreign names has come to be considered rude or rustic. Thus, Иване means 'hey, Ivan', while the corresponding feminine forms Елено ('hey, Elena'), Маргарито ('hey, Margarita') are today seen as rude or unceremonious, and declining foreign names as in *Джоне ('hey, John') or *Саймъне ('hey, Simon') is considered humorous.

The tendency to avoid vocative forms for foreign names does not apply to names from Classical Antiquity, with the source languages having the vocative case as well: cf. Цезаре' ('O Caesar'), Перикле ('O Pericles'), Зевсе ('O Zeus'), etc.

Vocative is still in full and regular use for general nouns such as господине (gospodine "mister"), госпожице (gospožice "miss"), госпожо (gospožo "Mrs"), бабо (babo "grandma"), майко (majko "mother"), сине (sine "son").

Remnants of grammatical cases
Old Bulgarian had an extensive system of declension which included seven grammatical cases: nominative, accusative, dative, genitive, locative, instrumental and vocative; of these, only what used to be nominative and vocative cases survives in modern Bulgarian. Though Bulgarian has lost its old declensional system, pronouns still have grammatical case; also, some nouns in indirect cases became fossilized and were reanalyzed as other parts of speech.

Remnants of grammatical cases in pronouns 
Personal pronouns still have different subject, direct object and indirect object forms.

The set of pronouns in italic is obsolete and is nowadays substituted by на + long direct object pronouns: на мен/на мене, на теб/на тебе, на него, на нея, на него, на нас, на вас, на тях. 

Interrogative, indefinite, negative, relative and universal pronouns have different subject and object forms, but only if some conditions are met:

 they are different only for masculine singular pronouns;
 only if pronoun refers to a male human being: e.g. човекът, с когото говоря  'the man that I'm talking to'; note that когото can be replaced with който in spoken language; but e.g. столът, на който седя  'the chair that I'm sitting on'.
 only if the pronoun is used alone, not attributively.

Otherwise, the subject and object pronouns are the same. The complete declension is summed up in the table below:

*These sets of pronouns are falling out of use, especially in spoken language. Instead of object forms, the subject ones tend to be used in more instances, e.g. на кой is used instead of на кого and кой  instead of кого and so on.

Single-word indirect object pronouns are obsolete.

Definite article 
The grammarians who standardised the Bulgarian literary language introduced the subject definite article (пълен член) -ът/-ят and the object definite article (кратък член) -a/-я. This distinction was artificial and did not occur in any Bulgarian dialect of the time.  The subject definite article is used with definite masculine singular nouns which are the subject of a sentence, otherwise the object definite article is used.

e.g. стол (stol "a chair") → столът (stolat "the chair", subject) → под стола (pod stola "under the chair", object).

In spoken language, there is no difference in pronunciation of subject and object definite articles.

Formerly inflected nouns as other parts of speech

Remnants of the accusative case 
Adverbs: сутрин, вечер, зимъс, днес, нощес, есенес, пролетес, лятос, вред.

Remnants of the dative case 
Adverbs and prepositions:

Remnants of the genitive case 
Adverbs: снощи, отстрани, довечера, отръки, допъти.

Remnants of the instrumental case 
Adverbs and prepositions: нощем ( "during the night", from нощ ( "night"); сбогом (sbogom "farewell" – lit. "with God", from с + бог s + bog); бегом (begom "while running" from бяг ( – running), посредством, пешком, пълзешком, силом, бегом, нощем, денем, сбогом, кръгом, гърбом, редом, тихом, мигом, ребром, цифром, числом, словом.

Remnants of the locative case 
Adverbs and prepositions: горе, отгоре, долу, отдолу, зиме, лете, утре, вкратце, есени, пролети, върху, срещу, между.

Adjectives
A Bulgarian adjective agrees in gender, number and definiteness with the noun it is appended to and is put usually before it. The comparative and the superlative form are formed analytically.

Pronouns

Nicolova distinguishes the following types of Bulgarian pronouns:

 personal;
 reflexive;
 possessive;
 reflexive possessive;
 demonstrative;
 universal;
 interrogative;
 relative;
 negative;
 indefinite.

Verbs

Word order
Although Bulgarian has almost no noun cases its word order is rather free. It is even freer than the word order of some languages that have cases, for example German. This is due to the agreement between the subject and the verb of a sentence. So in Bulgarian the sentence "I saw Lubomir" can be expressed thus:
 Видях Любомир.
   saw-1pSg Lyubomir
 Любомир (го) видях.
   Lyubomir (him) saw-1pSg
It is clear that the subject is "аз" ("I") (it has been dropped), because the verb "видях" is in the first person singular.

Other examples – Ivan greeted the girls:
 Иван поздрави момичетата.
   Ivan greeted-3pSg girls-the.
 Момичетата (ги) поздрави Иван.
   Girls-the (them) greeted-3pSg Ivan.
 Иван момичетата поздрави.
   Ivan girls-the greeted-3pSg.
 Момичетата Иван (ги) поздрави.
   Girls-the Ivan (them) greeted-3pSg.
 Поздрави Иван момичетата.
   Greeted-3pSg Ivan girls-the.
 Поздрави (ги) момичетата Иван.
   Greeted-3pSg (them) girls-the Ivan.
Theoretically all permutations are possible but the last one sounds rather odd.

The girls greeted Ivan:
 Момичетата поздравиха Иван.
   Girls-the greeted-3pPl Ivan.
 Иван (го) поздравиха момичетата.
   Ivan (him) greeted-3pPl girls-the.
 Момичетата Иван поздравиха.
   Girls-the Ivan greeted-3pPl.
 Иван момичетата (го) поздравиха.
   Ivan girls-the (him) greeted-3pPl.
 Поздравиха момичетата Иван.
   Greeted-3pPl girls-the Ivan.
 Поздравиха (го) Иван момичетата.
   Greeted-3pPl (him) Ivan girls-the.

The clitic doubling (го/ги) is obligatory only when the subject and the object are both in third person, and they are either both singular or both plural, but when the meaning is clear from the context it can be omitted. Examples:
 Иван го поздрави Мария. 
   Ivan him greeted-3pSg Maria.
   Maria greeted Ivan.
 Мария я поздрави Иван. 
   Maria her greeted-3pSg Ivan.
   Ivan greeted Maria.
but
 Ролите озвучиха артистите... 
   Roles-the sound-screened-3pPl artists-the...
   The artists...(their names) sound-screened the roles. (They made the soundtrack for the film.)
In the compound tenses, when a participle is used, and when the subject and the object are of different gender or number, the clitic doubling can also be left out. So the first two of the above examples can be expressed in a compound tense thus:
 Иван (го) е поздравила Мария.
   Ivan (him) has greeted-3pSgFem Maria.
   Maria has greeted Ivan.
 Мария (я) е поздравил Иван.
   Maria (her) has greeted-3pSgMasc Ivan.
   Ivan has greeted Maria.
The above two examples sound a bit odd without the doubling, unless it is a case of topicalization and special stress is put on the first word.

Syntax 
Bulgarian employs clitic doubling, mostly for emphatic purposes. For example, the following constructions are common in colloquial Bulgarian:

(lit. "I gave it the present to Maria.")

(lit. "I gave her it the present to Maria.")

The phenomenon is practically obligatory in the spoken language in the case of inversion signalling information structure (in writing, clitic doubling may be skipped in such instances, with a somewhat bookish effect):

(lit. "The present [to her] it I-gave to Maria.")

(lit. "To Maria to her [it] I-gave the present.")

Sometimes, the doubling signals syntactic relations, thus:

(lit. "Petar and Ivan them ate the wolves.")
Transl.: "Petar and Ivan were eaten by the wolves".

This is contrasted with:

(lit. "Petar and Ivan ate the wolves")
Transl.: "Petar and Ivan ate the wolves".

In this case, clitic doubling can be a colloquial alternative of the more formal or bookish passive voice, which would be constructed as follows:

(lit. "Petar and Ivan were eaten by the wolves.")

Clitic doubling is also fully obligatory, both in the spoken and in the written norm, in clauses including several special expressions that use the short accusative and dative pronouns such as "" (I feel like playing), студено ми е (I am cold), and боли ме ръката (my arm hurts):

(lit. "To me to me it-feels-like-sleeping, and to Ivan to him it-feels-like-playing")
Transl.: "I feel like sleeping, and Ivan feels like playing."

(lit. "To us to us it-is cold, and to you-plur. to you-plur. it-is warm")
Transl.: "We are cold, and you are warm."

(lit. Ivan him aches the throat, and me me aches the head)
Transl.: Ivan has sore throat, and I have a headache.

Except the above examples, clitic doubling is considered inappropriate in a formal context.

Other features

Questions
Questions in Bulgarian which do not use a question word (such as who? what? etc.) are formed with the particle ли after the verb; a subject is not necessary, as the verbal conjugation suggests who is performing the action:
 – 'you are coming';  – 'are you coming?'

While the particle  generally goes after the verb, it can go after a noun or adjective if a contrast is needed:
 – 'are you coming with us?';
 – 'are you coming with us'?
A verb is not always necessary, e.g. when presenting a choice:
 – 'him?';  – 'the yellow one?'

Rhetorical questions can be formed by adding  to a question word, thus forming a "double interrogative" –
 – 'Who?';  – 'I wonder who(?)'
The same construction +не ('no') is an emphasized positive –
 – 'Who was there?' –  – 'Nearly everyone!' (lit. 'I wonder who wasn't there')

Significant verbs

Съм

The verb   – 'to be' is also used as an auxiliary for forming the perfect, the passive and the conditional:
past tense –  – 'I have hit'
passive –  – 'I am hit'
past passive –  – 'I was hit'
conditional –  – 'I would hit'

Two alternate forms of  exist:
  – interchangeable with съм in most tenses and moods, but never in the present indicative – e.g.  ('I want to be'),  ('I will be here'); in the imperative, only бъда is used –  ('be here');
  – slightly archaic, imperfective form of бъда – e.g. Биваше заплашен.  ('he used to get threats'); in contemporary usage, it is mostly used in the negative to mean "ought not", e.g. Не бива да пушиш.  ('you shouldn't smoke').

Ще

The impersonal verb  (lit. 'it wants') is used to for forming the (positive) future tense:
отивам  – 'I am going'
ще отивам  – 'I will be going'
няма да отивам  – 'I will not be going'
The past tense of this verb – щях  is conjugated to form the past conditional ('would have' – again, with да, since it is irrealis):
щях да отида  – 'I would have gone;' щеше да отидеш  'you would have gone'

Имам and нямам

the third person singular of these two can be used impersonally to mean 'there is/there are' or 'there isn't/aren't any,'  e.g.
Има време.  ('there is still time' – compare Spanish hay);
Няма никого.  ('there is no one there').
The impersonal form няма is used in the negative future – (see ще above).
 used on its own can mean simply 'I won't' – a simple refusal to a suggestion or instruction.

Conjunctions and particles

But

In Bulgarian, there are several conjunctions all translating into English as "but", which are all used in distinct situations.

While there is some overlapping between their uses, in many cases they are specific. For example,  is used for a choice – Не това, ами това. – "not this one, but that one" (compare Spanish ), while ама is often used to provide extra information or an opinion – Казах го, ама сгреших. – "I said it, but I was wrong". Meanwhile, а provides contrast between two situations, and in some sentences can even be translated as "although", "while" or even "and" – Аз работя, а той блее. – "I'm working, and he's daydreaming".

Very often, different words can be used to alter the emphasis of a sentence – e.g. while  and  both mean "I smoke, but I shouldn't", the first sounds more like a statement of fact ("...but I mustn't"), while the second feels more like a judgement ("...but I oughtn't"). Similarly,  and  both mean "I don't want to, but he does", however the first emphasizes the fact that he wants to, while the second emphasizes the wanting rather than the person.

 is interesting in that, while it feels archaic, it is often used in poetry and frequently in children's stories, since it has quite a moral/ominous feel to it.

Some common expressions use these words, and some can be used alone as interjections:
 (lit. "yes, but no") – means "you're wrong to think so".
 can be tagged onto a sentence to express surprise:  – "he's sleeping!"
 – "you don't say!", "really!"

Vocative particles

Bulgarian has several abstract particles which are used to strengthen a statement. These have no precise translation in English. The particles are strictly informal and can even be considered rude by some people and in some situations. They are mostly used at the end of questions or instructions.
 – the most common particle. It can be used to strengthen a statement or, sometimes, to indicate derision of an opinion, aided by the tone of voice. (Originally purely masculine, it can now be used towards both men and women.)
 – tell me (insistence);  – is that so? (derisive);  – you don't say!.
 ( – expresses urgency, sometimes pleading.
 – come on, get up!
Although informal, can sometimes be heard being used by older people.

Modal particles

These are "tagged" on to the beginning or end of a sentence to express the mood of the speaker in relation to the situation. They are mostly interrogative or slightly imperative in nature. There is no change in the grammatical mood when these are used (although they may be expressed through different grammatical moods in other languages).
 – is a universal affirmative tag, like "isn't it"/"won't you", etc. (it is invariable, like the French ). It can be placed almost anywhere in the sentence, and does not always require a verb:
 – you are coming, aren't you?;  – didn't they want to?;  – that one, right?;
it can express quite complex thoughts through simple constructions –  – "I thought you weren't going to!" or "I thought there weren't any!" (depending on context – the verb  presents general negation/lacking, see "nyama", above).
 – expresses uncertainty (if in the middle of a clause, can be translated as "whether") – e.g.  – "do you think he will come?"
 – presents disbelief ~"don't tell me that..." – e.g.  – "don't tell me you want to!". It is slightly archaic, but still in use. Can be used on its own as an interjection – 
 – expresses hope –  – "he will come";  – "I hope he comes" (compare Spanish ). Grammatically,  is entirely separate from the verb  – "to hope".
 – means "let('s)" – e.g.  – "let him come"; when used in the first person, it expresses extreme politeness:  – "let us go" (in colloquial situations, below, is used instead).
, as an interjection, can also be used to express judgement or even schadenfreude –  – "he deserves it!".

Intentional particles

These express intent or desire, perhaps even pleading. They can be seen as a sort of cohortative side to the language. (Since they can be used by themselves, they could even be considered as verbs in their own right.) They are also highly informal.
 – "come on", "let's"
e.g.  – "faster!"
 – "let me" – exclusively when asking someone else for something. It can even be used on its own as a request or instruction (depending on the tone used), indicating that the speaker wants to partake in or try whatever the listener is doing.
 – let me see;  or  – "let me.../give me..."
 (plural ) – can be used to issue a negative instruction – e.g.  – "don't come" ( + subjunctive). In some dialects, the construction  ( + preterite) is used instead. As an interjection –  – "don't!" (See section on imperative mood).

These particles can be combined with the vocative particles for greater effect, e.g.  (let me see), or even exclusively in combinations with them, with no other elements, e.g.  (come on!);  (I told you not to!).

Pronouns of quality
Bulgarian has several pronouns of quality which have no direct parallels in English – kakav (what sort of); takuv (this sort of); onakuv (that sort of – colloq.); nyakakav (some sort of); nikakav (no sort of); vsyakakav (every sort of); and the relative pronoun kakavto (the sort of ... that ... ). The adjective ednakuv ("the same") derives from the same radical.

Example phrases include:
kakav chovek?! – "what person?!"; kakav chovek e toy? – what sort of person is he?
ne poznavam takuv – "I don't know any (people like that)" (lit. "I don't know this sort of (person)")
nyakakvi hora – lit. "some type of people", but the understood meaning is "a bunch of people I don't know"
vsyakakvi hora – "all sorts of people"
kakav iskash? – "which type do you want?"; nikakav! – "I don't want any!"/"none!"

An interesting phenomenon is that these can be strung along one after another in quite long constructions, e.g.

An extreme (colloquial) sentence, with almost no physical meaning in it whatsoever – yet which does have perfect meaning to the Bulgarian ear – would be :
"kakva e taya takava edna nyakakva nikakva?!"
inferred translation – "what kind of no-good person is she?"
literal translation: "what kind of – is – this one here (she) – this sort of – one – some sort of – no sort of"
—Note: the subject of the sentence is simply the pronoun "taya" (lit. "this one here"; colloq. "she").

Another interesting phenomenon that is observed in colloquial speech is the use of takova (neuter of takyv) not only as a substitute for an adjective, but also as a substitute for a verb. In that case the base form takova is used as the third person singular in the present indicative and all other forms are formed by analogy to other verbs in the language. Sometimes the "verb" may even acquire a derivational prefix that changes its meaning. Examples:
 takovah ti shapkata – I did something to your hat (perhaps: I took your hat)
 takovah si ochilata – I did something to my glasses (perhaps: I lost my glasses)
 takovah se – I did something to myself (perhaps: I hurt myself)
Another use of takova in colloquial speech is the word takovata, which can be used as a substitution for a noun, but also, if the speaker doesn't remember or is not sure how to say something, they might say takovata and then pause to think about it:
 i posle toy takovata... – and then he [no translation] ... 
 izyadoh ti takovata – I ate something of yours (perhaps: I ate your dessert). Here the word takovata is used as a substitution for a noun.
As a result of this versatility, the word takova can be used as a euphemism for literally anything. It is commonly used to substitute words relating to reproductive organs or sexual acts, for example:

 toy si takova takovata v takovata i – he [verb] his [noun] in her [noun]

Similar "meaningless" expressions are extremely common in spoken Bulgarian, especially when the speaker is finding it difficult to describe something.

Miscellaneous
The commonly cited phenomenon of Bulgarian people shaking their head for "yes" and nodding for "no" is true but, with the influence of Western culture, ever rarer, and almost non-existent among the younger generation. (The shaking and nodding are not identical to the Western gestures. The "nod" for no is actually an upward movement of the head rather than a downward one, while the shaking of the head for yes is not completely horizontal, but also has a slight "wavy" aspect to it.)
A dental click  (similar to the English "tsk") also means "no" (informal), as does ъ-ъ  (the only occurrence in Bulgarian of the glottal stop). The two are often said with the upward 'nod'.
Bulgarian has an extensive vocabulary covering family relationships. The biggest range of words is for uncles and aunts, e.g. chicho (your father's brother), vuicho (your mother's brother), svako (your aunt's husband); an even larger number of synonyms for these three exists in the various dialects of Bulgarian, including kaleko, lelincho, tetin, etc. The words do not only refer to the closest members of the family (such as brat – brother, but batko/bate – older brother, sestra – sister, but kaka – older sister), but extend to its furthest reaches, e.g. badzhanak from Turkish bacanak (the relationship of the husbands of two sisters to each other) and etarva (the relationships of two brothers' wives to each other). For all in-laws, there are specific names, e.g. a woman's husband's brother is her dever and her husband's sister is her zalva. In the traditional rural extended family before 1900, there existed separate subcategories for different brothers-in-law/sisters-in-law of a woman with regard to their age relative to hers, e.g. instead of simply a dever there could be a braino (older), a draginko (younger), or an ubavenkyo (who is still a child).
As with many Slavic languages, the double negative in Bulgarian is grammatically correct, while some forms of it, when used instead of a single negative form, are grammatically incorrect. The following are literal translations of grammatically correct Bulgarian sentences that utilize a double or multiple negation: "Никой никъде никога нищо не е направил." (multiple negation without the use of a compound double negative form, i.e. using a listing of several successive single negation words) – "Nobody never nowhere nothing did not do." (translated as "nobody has ever done anything, anywhere"); "Никога не съм бил там." (double negation without the use of a compound double negative form, i.e. using a listing of several successive single negation words) – I never did not go there ("[I] have never been there"); Никога никакви чувства не съм имал! – I never no feelings had not have!  (I have never had any feelings!). The same applies for Macedonian.

Numerals 

In Bulgarian, the numerals 1 and 2 are inflected for gender.

Furthermore, cardinal numerals take special endings when:
 referring to men (2–6 and 10, and 20–100) – add "-ma"
 e.g. 2 chairs – dva stola; 2 brothers – dvama bratya
 referring to an approximate number (10–100 and, rarely, 5–9) – add "-ina"
 e.g. dvadeset dushi – 20 people; dvadesetina dushi – about 20 people
 they are used as common nouns – add the feminine "-ka/-tsa" 

Notes:
 In Bulgarian, numerals can be used directly before uncountable nouns – e.g. vodа "water"  → edna voda "a glass of water" (the quantifier 'glass of' is inferred from the context – comp. English  'a beer''').
 The word edni can be translated as "some" – e.g. edni tzigari "some cigarettes" (comp. Spanish unos/unas).
 When counting, the neuter numbers are taken – edno, dve, tri....
 Fractions are the same as the ordinal numbers, and are done in the feminine 1/5 – edna peta, 2/5 – dve peti, etc.
 The words for men can be used by themselves, without a noun following – e.g. simply "vidyah dvama" – I saw two men, or even colloquially "edni dvama..." – these two men...
 Irregularly, "sedmina" and "osmina" can be used (archaically, poetically) to also mean "7/8 men" rather than "around 7/8".
 The smaller denomination of the Bulgarian currency – the stotìnka (pl. stotìnki)'' literally mean "hundredths" (diminutive); 100 stotinki = 1 lev.

Notes

References

External links 
 Bulgarian Wiktionary
 Notes on the Grammar of the Bulgarian language – 1844 – Smyrna (now Izmir) – Elias Riggs